Stan Seymour Jr. was a former chairman of Newcastle United and the son of Stan Seymour Sr.

Career
Born the son of the player, Stan Seymour Sr., in Scotland, Stan Seymour Jr managed a sports shop in Newcastle upon Tyne.

Seymour Jr. inherited his fathers' shareholding in Newcastle United, was appointed to the board of the company in April 1976, and went on to be chairman in March 1981. He stopped manager, Arthur Cox, from spending large amounts on acquiring players, worked hard to improve the financial position of the club and halted a takeover by businessman, Ernie Clay. He also brought the player, Kevin Keegan, to Newcastle United. He resigned as chairman as in 1988 and died at Birmingham in November 1992.

References

1992 deaths
Newcastle United F.C. directors and chairmen
Year of birth missing